Maelcoluim Ua Cormacain (died 1114) was an Abbot of Aran.

Ua Cormacain is one of the few named successors to Enda of Aran, dying early in the reign of King Tairrdelbach Ua Conchobair of Connacht. He may have been a member of the Ó Cormacáin ecclesiastical family based in Síol Anmchadha, in what is now southeast County Galway.

Since the 18th and 19th century the name has been rendered as Ó Cormacáin, Cormacan, and Cormican.

See also
 Ua Corcrain of Clonfert, Bishop of Clonfert, d. 1094.
 Muirchertach Ua Carmacáin, Bishop of Clonfert, 1195–1203.
 Uilliam Ó Cormacáin, Archbishop of Tuam, 5 May 1386–1393.
 Henry Ó Cormacáin, last Abbot of Clonfert, fl. c.1534-c.1567.

External links
 Annals of the Four Masters
 Irish Surnames johngrenham.com
 Cormican Irish Website

1114 deaths
12th-century deaths
Christian clergy from County Galway
12th-century Irish abbots
Year of birth unknown